The Tanning Tax Repeal Act of 2015 was legislation introduced in the U.S. House of Representatives by Congressman George Holding (R-NC). The bill would repeal the national 10% tax on indoor tanning services. Congressman Holding introduced the bill as H.R. 2698 on June 9, 2015.

By the end of the 114th Congress, the bill had 111 cosponsors.

Background

The 10% tax on indoor tanning services went into effect in 2010. It was passed as part of the Affordable Care Act ("Obamacare"). The IRS enforces the tax: any amount paid for tanning services is subject to a 10 percent excise tax.

Obamacare included 20 new or higher taxes, and the first one to go into effect was the tanning tax. The tanning tax imposes a 10 percent excise tax on all tanning bed customers in the U.S. The tax is collected in addition to state sales tax and income taxes paid by the tanning salon owner.

Since 2010, roughly half of all tanning salons in the United States have closed. Approximately 100,000 jobs were lost due to the closures.

Legislative history
The Tanning Tax Repeal Act had two main actions in the House:
 6/9/2015: Introduced in the House
 6/9/2015: Referred to the House Committee on Ways and Means
Although the bill was never acted upon in the Ways and Means Committee, the bill's language was incorporated into a larger piece of legislation, the Restoring Americans’ Healthcare Freedom Reconciliation Act of 2015 (H.R. 3762). That larger bill passed the House and Senate and was sent to President Barack Obama, who vetoed it. The House tried to override the veto with the required two-thirds vote, but failed to get enough votes to do so.

See also
 Excise tax
 Indoor tanning

References

External links
 List of 111 cosponsors of H.R.2698 - Tanning Tax Repeal Act of 2015

Proposed legislation of the 114th United States Congress